Adrian Tan Gim Hai (born 1966) is a Singaporean lawyer and author. Known for writing the Teenage Texbook series of books in the 1980s, he is the current president of the Law Society of Singapore and a partner at TSMP Law Corporation.

Early life and education 
Tan was born in Singapore to a Hainanese family. His parents were both teachers, and he grew up in a Housing Development Board (HDB) flat.

As a child, Tan attended the Anglo-Chinese School and Hwa Chong Junior College. After his A-levels, he was offered a teaching scholarship to study English at the University of East Anglia. He turned down the scholarship to study law at the National University of Singapore (NUS). Tan served his national service as a member of Pioneer, the MINDEF magazine, after injuring himself during basic military training. While in university, Tan represented NUS as a debater in international competitions and televised debates in Singapore. He later completed a second, joint-honours degree in computer science and psychology from the Open University in 2004, while working as a lawyer.

Career 
While an undergraduate law student at NUS, Tan wrote the novels The Teenage Textbook (1988) and The Teenage Workbook (1989), which became bestsellers that sold over 50,000 copies. The Teenage Textbook was also made into a stage play by The Necessary Stage in 1997; a film in 1998, which topped the box office in Singapore for four weeks; a 2017 musical titled The Teenage Textbook Musical; and a 2021 TV series on Channel 5. In 2015, The Teenage Textbook was listed by The Business Times as one of the top 10 English Singapore books from 1965–2015. Tan also was a consultant for the Channel 5 television legal drama, The Pupil. 

After graduating from NUS with a Bachelor of Laws degree, Tan began his legal career in 1991 at Drew and Napier, a large Singaporean firm. He initially practiced conveyancing law, but switched over to litigation thereafter, where he worked under Davinder Singh. In 1999, Tan left Drew for a two-year stint as general counsel of a technology firm, following which he returned to Drew. Eventually, after 22 years at Drew, Tan left to work for Stamford Law (now Morgan Lewis Stamford) in 2013. In 2018, Tan resigned from Stamford to work at TSMP Law. Tan practices litigation, and specialises in intellectual property, information technology, real estate, and shareholder oppression disputes. He is also the honorary counsel of the Singapore Association of the Visually Handicapped, a member of the boards of the Law Society Pro Bono Services, Maxwell Chambers, and Arts House Limited, and was previously a member of the Speak Good English Movement committee.

From 2013 to 2021, Tan was a member of the Law Society Council, serving as treasurer in 2016 and vice president in 2017. In 2022, he was appointed president. As president of the law society, he is known for his public outreach on legal issues, such as the HDB's ban on cats,  the 2022 bar exam cheating scandal, and Richard Branson's comments on the death penalty in Singapore.

Notable cases 

 Wee Shuo Woon v HT S.R.L. [2017] SGCA 23
 Turf Club Auto Emporium Pte Ltd v Yeo Boong Hua [2018] SGCA 44
 Singsung Pte Ltd v LG 26 Electronics Pte Ltd (trading as L S Electrical Trading) [2016] SGCA 33
 Y.E.S. F&B Group Pte Ltd v Soup Restaurant Singapore Pte Ltd (formerly known as Soup Restaurant (Causeway Point) Pte Ltd) [2015] SGCA 55
 Acted as counsel in proceedings concerning Gilstead Court, Thomson View, and Shunfu Ville collective sales.

Personal life 
Tan is married and has no children. In March 2022, he was diagnosed with cancer.

Bibliography
 "Dear Adam, Help!" (1988, Hotspot Books) ISBN 9813002352 
The Teenage Textbook (1988, Hotspot Books) 
 The Teenage Workbook (1989, Hotspot Books)

References

External links

 Adrian Tan at TSMP Law Corporation
 Internet Movie Database profile of The Teenage Textbook Movie
 The World According to Adrian Tan - Inkpot Interview

Singaporean writers
20th-century Singaporean lawyers
Singaporean people of Chinese descent
Anglo-Chinese School alumni
National University of Singapore alumni
Living people
1966 births
21st-century Singaporean lawyers